Sonny Gibbon (? – ?) was a Welsh footballer who played as a defender. He made 127 appearances in all competitions and scored once for Fulham.

Welsh footballers
Fulham F.C. players
English Football League players
Association football defenders